Dubai Holding is Dubai ruler Sheikh Mohammed bin Rashid al-Maktoum's personal investment portfolio, which owns 99.67% of the capital. 

It is a global investment holding company. Mohamed al Gergawi built the portfolio. Sheikh Ahmed bin Saeed al-Maktoum has been appointed as chairman by Dubai ruler. Dubai Holding has over US$130 billion in assets in 13 countries as well more than 20,000 employees worldwide. 

In 2021, the Pandora Papers leaks revealed that Dubai Holding owned three companies through a secretive offshore system.

History

Dubai Holding was established in 2004.

 2004: Madinat Jumeirah opened, as a themed Arabian resort.
 2005: Dubai Studio City was announced.
 2005: du launched in 2005, with the mission to connect people and businesses through mobile, telephone, broadband and IPTV services across the UAE.
 2005: Dubai International Academic City opened.
 2006: Emirates International Communications (EIT) launched in 2006, and invests in communication organizations across the Middle East, Europe, Africa and South Asia, including Interoute Communications Ltd. 
 2007: SmartCity launched in Kochi and Malta, creating purpose-built spaces for working and living.
 2008: Jumeirah Beach Residence official opening.
 2013: The Dubai Design District (d3) was created for the design community, both local and international.
 2013: in5 launched to provide early stage companies with support, infrastructure and a working environment.
 2014: Mall of the World was announced in 2014, to aligned with the Dubai Tourism Vision 2020.
 2014: The Creative Community at d3 was announced in 2014, offering an outdoor space for creatives.
 2014: The Innovation Hub was announced in 2014, and will focus on innovation across new media, technology, smart education and sciences coming from Dubai Media City and Dubai Internet City. Phase I will be launched in 2017.

Subsidiaries
Major business groups of Dubai Holding:

 Jumeirah Group
 Dubai Properties
 TECOM Group
 Arab Media Group 
 Dubai International Capital
 Dubai Group
 Emirates Integrated Telecommunications Company
 Meraas
 Wild Wadi Waterpark
 The Emirates Academy of Hospitality Management
 Dubai Parks and Resorts

References

Financial services companies established in 2004
Companies based in Dubai
Investment companies of the United Arab Emirates
Holding companies established in 2004
Government-owned companies of the United Arab Emirates